WBBK (1260 AM) was a radio station licensed to Blakely, Georgia, United States. The station was owned by Flint Media, Inc.

The station's license was cancelled and its call sign deleted by the Federal Communications Commission on July 28, 2011.

References

External links

BBK
Radio stations disestablished in 2011
Defunct radio stations in the United States
Radio stations established in 1979
1979 establishments in Georgia (U.S. state)
2011 disestablishments in Georgia (U.S. state)
BBK
BBK